The Waterloo Center for the Arts is an art museum in Waterloo, Iowa. It is home to the largest collection of Haitian art outside of Haiti. It also includes the Phelps Youth Pavilion, where children learn about art through art activities; as well as the Black Hawk Children's Theatre. The center has a permanent section of works by American artist Grant Wood. With Brown University and the Rhode Island School of Design, the Center sponsored a series called Reframing Haiti: Art, History, and Performativity. The center's official slogan is "Stimulating inquiry, provoking dialogue and connecting people through the arts."

Galleries 
The Center collects many kinds of art, including art from the American Midwest; American Decorative Arts; and international folk art. It has a significant collection of Mexican folk art, and the world's largest public collection of Haitian art. Its permanent galleries include:

The Forsberg Riverside Galleries, which focuses on Midwest art, American crafts and Haitian and Caribbean Art
The Law-Reddington Galleries, with changing exhibits and a theatre
The Reuling Feldman Galleries, containing a large portion of the center's Haitian art
The Watkins Grand Foyer, with changing exhibits
The Langlass Loft Gallery, with Haitian art, and a balcony overlooking the Watkins Grand Foyer and downtown Waterloo
The Rotary Lichty Gallery, with community outreach exhibits
The Longfellow Consourse, which includes the Waterloo Community Playhouse, Black Hawk Children's Theatre, changing art exhibits, and a view of the Cedar River
The Urban Galleries, a series of art installations in downtown storefronts
West Gallery, with changing exhibits
The Block-Loomis Consourse, changing art exhibits with children in mind
Riverloop Sculpture Plaza, with outdoor seating and sculptures from the center's permanent collection

Other features 
The Riverloop Amphitheatre is a rentable outdoor space with seating for up to 3,000, where outdoor concerts are held in the summertime.

Mark's Park is a summertime outdoor waterpark/playground for the free use of children. It is named after Mark Young, a Waterloo resident who died in a motorcycle accident in 2003.

References 

Museums in Black Hawk County, Iowa
Art museums and galleries in Iowa